Peanut Butter is the second and final album by Welsh noise-pop band Joanna Gruesome, released in the spring of 2015. It received favorable reviews from critics and is the last album recorded with the lead singer Alanna McArdle before her departure from the band.

Reception 
In general, critics praised Peanut Butter as musically tighter, more self-aware, and more stylistically developed than their previous album, Weird Sister. Their distinctive blend of harsh guitar riffs and "bubblegum" vocal harmonies with unexpected chords and progressions is a key feature of this album. The lyrics have been praised for playfully blending "the abstract and the concrete" and for their "hyper-specificity" that pulls from personal experiences to create engaging and enigmatic songs.

Track listing

References

2015 albums
Joanna Gruesome albums